IHLIA LGBT Heritage, formerly known as the International Gay/Lesbian Information Center and Archive (IHLIA), is an international archive and documentation center on homosexuality, bisexuality and transgender. It collects, preserves and presents to the public all kinds of information in the field of LGBT. IHLIA curates the largest LGBT collection of Europe with over 100,000 titles on 1515 meters of shelf length – books, journals and magazines, films, documentaries, posters, photographs and objects such as T-shirts, buttons and condom packaging.  IHLIA was founded in 1999 by merging the Homodok (documentation on homosexuality of the University of Amsterdam) and the Lesbian Archives of Amsterdam and Leeuwarden. Since 2007, IHLIA is located in the Public Library Amsterdam. IHLIA and the George Mosse Fund organize the annual Mosse Lectures.
Over 95% of their annual budget, about 800.000 euros, comes from the country's government. They are 14 employees, almost all part-time. 
The biggest part of their LGBT archives collection is in fact hosted at International Institute of Social History, in Amsterdam too.

See also
  (Cologne)
 GLBT Historical Society (San Francisco)
 ONE National Gay & Lesbian Archives (Los Angeles)
 Schwules Museum (Berlin)
 Tucson LGBTQ Museum (Tucson)

References

External links
 Website (Dutch), English

LGBT organisations in the Netherlands
Libraries in Amsterdam
Archives in the Netherlands
LGBT museums and archives